Markdorf is a town in the Bodenseekreis district, in Baden-Württemberg, Southern Germany. It is situated near Lake Constance, 10 km northwest of Friedrichshafen. Georg Riedmann has been the mayor of Markdorf since 2013.

Markdorf was first mentioned in 817 AD and it was given city rights in 1250. It was host to the church council before it was moved to Konstanz.

Markdorf with its historic downtown lies beneath the Gehrenberg mountain, on the top of which there is a 30m high climbable tower, which gives a view over Lake Constance and the Swiss, Austrian and German Alps.

On 22 December 1939, the location was host to a major train accident which occasioned the death of about 100 people.

References 

Bodenseekreis
Baden